Atabak-e Kati (also Romanized as Atābak-e Katī; also known as Atābak-e Pā’īn and Atābak) is a village in Jamabrud Rural District, in the Central District of Damavand County, Tehran Province, Iran. At the 2006 census, its population was 146, in 45 families.

References 

Populated places in Damavand County